The 1908 United States presidential election in Rhode Island took place on November 3, 1908 as part of the 1908 United States presidential election. Voters chose four representatives, or electors to the Electoral College, who voted for president and vice president.

Rhode Island voted for the Republican nominee, Secretary of War William Howard Taft, over the Democratic nominee, former U.S. Representative William Jennings Bryan. Taft won the state by a margin of 26.6%.

With 60.76% of the popular vote, Rhode Island would be Taft's fifth strongest victory in terms of percentage in the popular vote after Vermont, Maine, Michigan and North Dakota.

Results

See also
 United States presidential elections in Rhode Island

References

Rhode Island
1908
1908 Rhode Island elections